Arie Gerrit van der Stel (24 April 1894 – 31 January 1986) was a Dutch cyclist. He competed in three events at the 1920 Summer Olympics.

See also
 List of Dutch Olympic cyclists

References

External links
 

1894 births
1986 deaths
Dutch male cyclists
Olympic cyclists of the Netherlands
Cyclists at the 1920 Summer Olympics
Cyclists from The Hague